Pseudocordylus melanotus, also known as the common crag lizard or Highveld crag lizard, is a species of lizard found in Eswatini, Lesotho, and South Africa. Pseudocordylus subviridis is considered a distinct species by the Reptile Database, but a subspecies of Pseudocordylus melanotus by IUCN.

Pseudocordylus melanotus an ovoviviparous lizard, tolerant of temperatures no lower than –5 °C, and consequently occurring on rocky outcrops, hills and mountains throughout southern Africa. Various subspecies are found in the inland mountains of the Eastern Cape (Amatole–Great Winterberg) and Cape Fold Mountains, the Natal and Transvaal Drakensberg and foothills, Lesotho and Eswatini with an isolated population at Suikerbosrand, and also at the Magaliesberg which geologically is part of the Transvaal Drakensberg. The type specimen was collected by the Scots zoologist Andrew Smith in 1838 in the hills between the main branches of the Orange River east of Philippolis, Orange Free State.

References

External links
iSpot records
List of South African reptiles - Johan Marais

Pseudocordylus
Lizards of Africa
Reptiles of Eswatini
Reptiles of Lesotho
Reptiles of South Africa
Reptiles described in 1838
Taxa named by Andrew Smith (zoologist)